Squadra antitruffa is a 1977 Italian crime film directed by Bruno Corbucci and starring David Hemmings, Tomas Milian and Anna Cardini. It is the third chapter in the Nico Giraldi film series starred by Tomas Milian.

Plot 
A rude Roman policeman (Nico Giraldi) and an English detective team up in search of a gang that has carried out an enormous fraud against the Lloyd's of London. The culprits eliminate all possible witnesses but, despite everything, the couple still manages to climb to the head and sent him to jail.

Main cast
 Tomas Milian - Nico Giraldi
 David Hemmings - Robert Clayton
 Anna Cardini - The Girl
 Alberto Farnese - Avv. Ferrante
 Massimo Vanni - Brigadiere Gargiulo
 Leo Gullotta - Tarcisio Pollaroli -  Er Fibbia
 Bombolo - Franco Bertarelli - a.k.a. Venticello
 Antonio De Leo -  Milord
 John P. Dulaney - Ballarin (uncredited)
 Marcello Martana - maresciallo Trentini
 Roberto Alessandri - Aldo Proietti - a.k.a. Er Picchio
 Marcello Verziera - The False Killer
 Natale Nazzareno - Taxi driver
 Giancarlo Badessi - Baruffaldi - the Atalanta supporter
 Roberto Messina - Commissario Tozzi
 Marco Tulli - Venticello's Accomplice

References

External links

1977 films
1977 crime films
1970s Italian-language films
Films set in Rome
Films set in San Francisco
Poliziotteschi films
Films directed by Bruno Corbucci
Films scored by Guido & Maurizio De Angelis
1970s Italian films